Antonio Goicoechea (21 January 1876, in Barcelona – 11 February 1953, in Madrid) was an Alfonsine monarchist politician and lawyer in Spain during the period of the Second Spanish Republic and the Spanish Civil War. He started to become politically relevant when he became the leader of the Juventudes Mauristas, and he would later serve as Minister of the Interior from 15 April 1919 to 20 July 1919 in a Maura cabinet. He led the authoritarian Renovación Española political party. Prior to the Civil War, Goicoechea in 1934 had negotiated along with the Carlists Antonio Lizarza Iribarren and Rafael de Olazábal y Eulate with the Italian dictator Benito Mussolini on a military agreement to guarantee Italian support of their movements if a civil war erupted in Spain. However, according to Lizarza, when the Civil War erupted in 1936, it had not been initiated by Goicoechea or other members of the agreement but by a group of army officers and so Goicoechea's agreement with Mussolini did not go forward. After Falange Española Tradicionalista y de las Juntas de Ofensiva Nacional Sindicalista emerged in 1937, Goicoechea dissolved Renovación Española and served as the 58th Governor of the Bank of Spain (from 1938 to 1950) and Procurador en Cortes (representative of the Francoist legislature).

References

Bibliography 
 

1876 births
1953 deaths
People from Barcelona
Conservative Party (Spain) politicians
Spanish Patriotic Union politicians
Popular Action (Spain) politicians
Renovación Española politicians
Government ministers of Spain
Members of the Congress of Deputies of the Spanish Restoration
Members of the Congress of Deputies of the Second Spanish Republic
Members of the Cortes Españolas
Spanish people of the Spanish Civil War (National faction)
Leaders of political parties in Spain
Governors of the Bank of Spain
Maurism
Interior ministers of Spain